Jesús Rangel  (born ) is a Mexican male volleyball player. He was part of the Mexico men's national volleyball team at the 2014 FIVB Volleyball Men's World Championship in Poland. He currently plays for Tigres UANL.

Clubs
 CV Zaragoza (2008-2010)
 Palma Voley (2010-2011)
 Tigres UANL (2013-2014)
 Halcones (2014-2016)
 Unicaja Costa de Almería (2017-2018)
 Tigres UANL (2018-2020)

References

External links

 Player profile at Volleybox.net

1980 births
Living people
Mexican men's volleyball players
Place of birth missing (living people)
Olympic volleyball players of Mexico
Volleyball players at the 2016 Summer Olympics